Hector Francis McDougall (June 6, 1848 – November 27, 1914) was a merchant and political figure in Nova Scotia, Canada. He represented Cape Breton in the House of Commons of Canada from 1884 to 1900 as a Liberal-Conservative.

McDougall was born in Christmas Island, Nova Scotia, the son of Malcolm McDougall and Mary McNeil. He was named a justice of the peace in 1873. In 1875, he married Christina Cameron. McDougall became a general merchant at Christmas Island. He was a councillor for Cape Breton Municipality Number 14, Grassy Narrows, from 1886 to 1889. McDougall represented Cape Breton County in the Nova Scotia House of Assembly from 1878 to 1882. He was a minister without portfolio in the province's Executive Council. He ran unsuccessfully for a seat in the House of Commons in 1882 but was elected in an 1884 by-election held after William McDonald was named to the Senate. McDougall was unsuccessful in a bid for reelection in 1900. He died in Glace Bay at the age of 66.

References 

1848 births
1914 deaths
Progressive Conservative Association of Nova Scotia MLAs
Conservative Party of Canada (1867–1942) MPs
Members of the House of Commons of Canada from Nova Scotia
People from the Cape Breton Regional Municipality
Canadian justices of the peace